Héctor Adrián Baillié (born November 26, 1960 in Lanús, Buenos Aires, Argentina) is a former Argentine footballer who played for clubs of Argentina and Chile.

References

 
 

1960 births
Living people
Argentine footballers
Argentine expatriate footballers
Unión de Santa Fe footballers
Sportivo Italiano footballers
Chaco For Ever footballers
Club Atlético Douglas Haig players
Club Atlético Banfield footballers
Quilmes Atlético Club footballers
Club Atlético Lanús footballers
El Porvenir footballers
Talleres de Remedios de Escalada footballers
C.D. Huachipato footballers
Argentine Primera División players
Chilean Primera División players
Expatriate footballers in Chile
Association football forwards
Sportspeople from Lanús